XXVII World Rhythmic Gymnastics Championships were held in Baku the capital of Azerbaijan, 3–10 October 2005 at the Heydar Aliyev Sports and Exhibition Complex.

Medal winners

* reserve gymnast

Individual

Qualifications

Team All-Around

Individual All-Around

Individual Rope

Individual Ball

Individual Clubs

Individual Ribbon

Groups

Group compositions

Group All-Around

Groups Final 5 Ribbons

Groups Final 3 Hoops + 2 Clubs

Medal table

References
 
 
 
 

Rhythmic Gymnastics World Championships
Rhythmic Gymnastics Championships
Rhythmic Gymnastics Championships
Sports competitions in Baku
2005 in Azerbaijani sport